The Oldenburg Baby is the name given by the German media to Tim, an infant born in Oldenburg, Lower Saxony, Germany on 6 July 1997. Tim was born prematurely in the twenty-fifth week of pregnancy as the result of a failed late-term abortion. Doctors had expected the child would soon die and thus withheld treatment for nine hours. He became a focus of the debate surrounding abortion, especially late-term abortion, and its legal and ethical consequences.

Tim died on the 4th of January 2019 from a lung infection; he was 21 years old.

Background
Upon learning that their fetus was diagnosed with Down syndrome, Tim's parents sought a late-term abortion at the Städtische Frauenklinik hospital.  Tim was born prematurely in the twenty-fifth week of pregnancy as the result of the failed procedure. Doctors had expected the child would soon die and thus withheld treatment, but when the child continued to breathe after nine hours, doctors decided to treat him. He became a focus of the debate surrounding abortion, especially late-term abortion, and its legal and ethical consequences.

Medical consequences
Tim's biological parents chose not to raise him, so he remained in a children's clinic in Oldenburg until March 1998, when he was taken in by a foster family. In 2006, his foster parents were awarded the Federal Cross of Merit for taking care of the boy as well as another child born with Down syndrome. His foster mother claims he exhibited autistic tendencies.

Legal and ethical consequences
Medical texts have used this case as an example to illustrate the need for proper precautions when performing abortions and prenatal screening. The child's biological parents sued the clinic and the gynaecologist for damages and compensation, claiming that they had not been informed that their child could survive an abortion at that stage. Bundestag member Hubert Hüppe (CDU) also tried to press charges on the separate grounds that it was not clear whether a medical justification was present in this case, and because the doctor's duty of care had not been fulfilled for several hours, which he claimed defied Article 3 of the German constitution ("No person shall be disfavoured because of disability"). The clinic denied these claims, claiming that the mother delayed the diagnosis. Initially charges of battery were supposed to be pressed against the physician who had performed the abortion and left Tim without any form of medical attention. No charges were ever brought against the doctor and the investigations were ended. In 2004, he was fined ninety days' pay for failing to care for the newborn.

Legal professionals in Germany have sought to pass a ban on late-term abortion, citing this case as an example. The CDU/CSU and Social Democratic Party of Germany agreed to help investigate ways to reduce the number of abortions.

Media
In 2005 a documentary about Tim was aired on WDR entitled Menschen hautnah – Er sollte sterben – doch Tim lebt. Eine Abtreibung und ihre Folgen.

See also
 Gianna Jessen

References

External links
Tim's personal homepage (in German)
Article from the Stuttgarter Zeitung (7 January 1998) about the investigation 

Abortion in Germany
People with Down syndrome
People from Oldenburg (city)
German children
Infancy
1997 births
2019 deaths